Neubrandenburg or Neubrandenburg in the Morning Mist (German - Neubrandenburg im Morgennebel) is an oil on canvas painting by Caspar David Friedrich, executed c. 1816, now in the Pommersches Landesmuseum in Griefswald. The artist's parents were both born in Neubrandenburg and he often painted it - another example is Neubrandenburg Burning.

Until 1900 it was owned by Langguth, a Griefswald merchant and relation of the artist. Around 1928 it was acquired by the Städtisches Museum Stettin and was placed in the Stettiner Gemäldesammlung on the Veste Coburg from 1945 until 1970, before moving to the Stiftung Pommern in Kiel. It has been in its present location since 1999.

See also
List of works by Caspar David Friedrich

References

External links

1816 paintings
Paintings by Caspar David Friedrich
Paintings in Mecklenburg-Western Pomerania